Muhammad Mueenuddeen I was the sultan of the Maldives from 1798 to 1835. He ruled for 37 years, 1 month  and 4 days.

1835 deaths
18th-century sultans of the Maldives
19th-century sultans of the Maldives
Year of birth missing